Vianney may refer to:

Persons

Surname
 John Vianney (1786–1859), French parish priest who is venerated in the Catholic Church as a saint and as the patron saint of all priests. Because of his fame, his name has been given to several places in Quebec,  and his surname has become a French first name.

Given name
 Vianney (singer), French singer-songwriter
 Vianney Décarie, Canadian philosopher 
 Vyanney Guyonnet, member of the French super vocal group Les Stentors 
 Vianney Mabidé (born 1988), Central African football (soccer) player

Places
 Vianney, Quebec, a former municipality that merged into Saint-Ferdinand, Quebec in 2000
 Saint-Vianney, Quebec, municipality in Quebec, Canada
 Saint-Jean-Vianney, former village in the Saguenay-Lac-Saint-Jean region of Quebec, now abandoned after it was partially destroyed in a landslide in 1971

Other uses
 Vianney (album)

See
 Vianne

French masculine given names